The passerine birds of the genus Aphelocoma include the scrub jays and their relatives. They are New World jays  found in Mexico, western Central America and the western United States, with an outlying population in Florida. This genus belongs to the group of New World (or "blue") jays–possibly a distinct subfamily–which is not closely related to other jays, magpies or treepies. They live in open pine-oak forests, chaparral, and mixed evergreen forests.

Systematics

Seven species of Aphelocoma are generally recognized at the present time. They are believed to have evolved in the Pleistocene, and the Florida scrub jay is known to have been recognizably distinct and present in its current range for at least two million years. The inland, coastal, and Santa Cruz island populations of the (former) western scrub-jay are now considered three separate species: Woodhouse's, the California and the island scrub jays. Two different populations of the Mexican jay might similarly represent two separate species.

mtDNA NADH dehydrogenase subunit 2 sequence data is unable to properly resolve the relationships of the species. Judging from New World jay biogeography, the unicolored or Mexican jays might represent the most basal lineage; morphology would tentatively lean towards the latter which retains more of the group's color patterns, while the available molecular data allows no robust conclusions whatsoever. In any case, the data of Rice et al. (2003) suggests – albeit also with very low confidence – that the Mexican jay comprises two clades which might constitute two separate species. However, far too few individuals have been sampled to say anything definite on that matter, except that the lineages – if they indeed exist – do not correspond to the geographical pattern of intraspecific variation (see species article for more).

The western scrub-jay is now made up of three species. These would be separated by the Great Basin, with the Pacific coastal lineage (California scrub-jay) and the island scrub-jay, as well as the inland lineage (Woodhouse's scrub-jay), with the Florida scrub-jay being a sister species. This treatment fails to address the problem of birds from inland southern Mexico. Nonetheless, it is actually because the molecular diversity pattern is so badly resolved that it supports the view that rapid Late Pliocene radiation of the North American scrub-jays led to the present diversity. Studies on the evolutionary history of Aphelocoma jays suggests that all New World jays originated in North America or Mesoamerica.

Description
Aphelocoma jays are slightly larger than the Blue Jay and differ in having a longer tail, slightly shorter, more rounded wings, and no crest on the head. The top of the head, nape, and sides of the head are a rich deep blue.  Some species have a white stripe above the eye and dark ear coverts. The breast is also white or grey-white and the back is a grey-brown contrasting with the bright blue tail and wings in most species. One species, the Unicolored Jay, is blue all over, superficially similar to the Pinyon Jay from much further north.  The bill, legs, and feet are black.

Behavior

The diet consists mainly of acorns and pine nuts. However, grain, berries, and other fruits are often eaten as well. These birds can also be omnivorous; their diet can include insects, eggs and nestlings, small frogs, mice, and reptiles. As food-storing birds, the scrub jays demonstrate a unique episodic memory. They can find their food hiding places with great precision, even several days after the initial cache.

Wild Aphelocoma jays are frequent visitors at campsites and picnics and have frequently learned to eat from the hands of people where they have become accustomed to being fed.

The nest is in a tree or a bush, sometimes quite low down. The nests are compact and lined with hair and fine roots with an outer diameter of about 30 cm to 60 cm. Usually 2 to 4 eggs are laid and incubated over 14 to 16 days. There are two main variations of egg shell color: green with olive markings or a paler background of grayish-white to green with red-brown markings. The Florida scrub jay and the Mexican jay both have cooperative breeding systems involving several 'helpers' at each nest, usually relatives of the breeding pair.

Increased prolactin in the breeding pair leads to the expression of parental behavior and physiology. The source of the alloparental behavior found in helper birds has been the focus of many studies. A positive correlation was found between increased prolactin levels during the breeding period and helping behavior in non-breeding Aphelocoma jays. This suggests that helper birds do not simply respond to the calls of the young, but begin to show parental behavior even before the chicks hatch.  These data suggest that natural selection may be acting on cooperative breeding in Aphelocoma jays and New World jays in general because the birds are reacting to more than just an environmental stimulus. Studies have also been done on Florida scrub jays (Aphelocoma coerulescens) and results have confirmed the hypothesis that increased prolactin levels are correlated with an increase in parental behavior in helper birds.  Scrub jays are members of the family Corvidae, which are considered the most intelligent of the birds and among the most intelligent of all animals.

Aphelocoma jays are quite vocal and have a huge range of sounds and calls; common calls include a cheek, cheek, cheek and a guttural churring krr'r'r'r'r. Aphelocoma jays are also, like all other jays, often quite aggressive, antagonistic at feeding areas and sometimes regarded as a nuisance.

Notes

References

External links

 

Bird genera
Jays
Taxa named by Jean Cabanis